Mandanahalli is a small village near Mysore in Karnataka state, India.

Location
Mandanahalli is located on Mananthavady Road.

Demographics
Mandanahalli has a population of 969 people. Children form 12 per cent of the total population. There are 215 houses in the village.

Administration
Mandanahalli village is part of Harohalli gram panchayath in Mysore tehsil.

See also

 Anthara Santhe
 Daripura, Mysore
 Harohalli
 Jayapura, Mysore

References

Villages in Mysore district